Dave Davis (born 1989) is an American actor based out of Los Angeles and New Orleans. He is best known for his role in the 2019 horror film The Vigil.

Early life and education
Davis was born in 1989 in Princeton, New Jersey, into a Jewish family. He grew up in New Orleans. Davis graduated from the Lawrenceville School in 2007, and earned a Bachelor of Fine Arts in theatre from Tulane University in 2011. In fulfillment of his thesis, he starred in Kenneth Lonergan's This Is Our Youth.

Career
Davis has been acting since childhood. He spent five years with the New Orleans Shakespeare Festival, culminating with the critically acclaimed role of Hamlet in 2012. Davis then transitioned into screen acting. Based out of New Orleans, Davis starred in many original films for MTV and Syfy, including Ghost Shark, Leprechaun's Revenge, Ozark Sharks, and several others. Notably, he guest starred in True Detective and The Walking Dead, and acted in The Big Short and Logan. Davis relocated to Los Angeles in 2015, where he currently works.

Davis won the Special Jury Prize for Performance at the 2017 Nashville Film Festival for his lead role in the independent film Bomb City. In 2019, Davis starred in the horror film The Vigil, in which he plays a man tasked with watching over a deceased member of an Orthodox Jewish community.

Davis is a member of the comedy group Bare Handed Bear Handlers. They have released a web miniseries, short films, and a number of music videos.

Filmography

Film

Television

References

External links 

Living people
1989 births
American male film actors
Tulane University alumni
Lawrenceville School alumni
American male stage actors
American stand-up comedians
Male actors from New Jersey
People from Princeton, New Jersey
Rappers from New Jersey
Rappers from New Orleans
Male actors from Louisiana
American male television actors
Writers from New Jersey
Writers from Louisiana
American male singer-songwriters
American male Shakespearean actors
21st-century American rappers
21st-century American comedians
21st-century American male musicians
Singer-songwriters from New Jersey
Singer-songwriters from Louisiana